The Mahabodhi Temple is a Buddhist temple located in Bagan, Myanmar. It was built during the reign of King Htilominlo (r. 1211–1235), and is modelled after the Mahabodhi Temple in Bihar, India. The temple is built in an architectural style typical during the Gupta period, and contains a large pyramidal tower with many niches containing over 450 images of Buddha. The temple survived the 1975 Bagan earthquake, and was repaired in following years.

References

 
 

Buddhist temples in Myanmar
13th-century Buddhist temples
Bagan